Advanced Headquarters 'A' Force, generally referred to as 'A' Force, was the name of a deception department during the Second World War. It was set up in March 1941 and based in Cairo under Brigadier Dudley Clarke. General Archibald Wavell, the commander of forces in North Africa at the outbreak of war, initiated the use of deception as part of Operation Compass, in December 1940. After the success of Compass, Wavell sent for Clarke, with whom he had earlier worked in Palestine. Clarke was charged with forming the first deception department, in secret with limited resources.

Background

On 10 June 1940, Italy declared war on the Allied nations. The British Middle East Command, based in Egypt under General Archibald Wavell, fought a defensive war against Italian forces until Autumn, when it initiated more offensive manoeuvres.

In November Wavell planned an offensive, Operation Compass, against Italian troops at Sidi Barrani. As part of the operation he tried to deceive the enemy about the strength of British forces; via disinformation and visual deception. Compass, executed on 9 December, was a tactical success; something Wavell attributed to the accompanying deception. On 13 December he informed Allied high command of his intention to form a department to manage deception, and requested Dudley Clarke be sent to Cairo to help.

Clarke arrived in Egypt on 18 December and at first worked alone and in secret, under the official title "Intelligence Officer (special duties) to the Commander in Chief". He had neither staff nor official mandate, and worked from a "converted bathroom" at the British Army headquarters, Cairo. His cover role was to establish a regional department for MI9, the somewhat less secret organisation tasked with helping Allied servicemen in escape and evasion tactics. Far from being a token cover, Clarke ran MI9's Middle East department, in tandem with his deception work, until .

'A' Force
By 1941, Clarke began to work with others, specialists in specific deception arts. Major Victor Jones was an engineer with the 14th/20th King's Hussars who had organised several tactical deceptions using dummy tanks. Mark Ogilvie-Grant was a Captain in the Scots Guards, Clarke recruited him to help with the spreading of disinformation.

In  Clarke began fabricating the existence of a British paratrooper regiment in the region, Operation Abeam, based on intelligence recovered the previous December. An Italian officer's journal had somehow been acquired, in it the officer expressed fear of an airborne assault. It would be two years before Allied paratroopers were deployed to North Africa, but Clarke planned to enhance these fears by creating a fictional "Special Air Service Brigade". Major Jones created a fleet of dummy gliders and Clarke organised fake radio traffic and information leaks. He even dressed two soldiers in "1 SAS" uniforms and set them to wander around Cairo, Port Said and Alexandria hinting at missions in Crete or Libya.

By March, Clarke had another scheme in the works; a deception cover for Operation Cordite (the 6th Infantry Division invasion of Rhodes). His work interviewing locals about the Greek island could not be associated with the 6th so he adopted the guise of 'A' Force. The name was intentionally vague, designed to add to the mythology of his fictional airborne unit. Although at first only a cover name, the department would soon become real and take control of all deception in the region. On  Clarke requisitioned , Cairo – opposite  and below a brothel – and in April received official mandate for his department.

Struggles
With 'A' Force well established Clarke felt able to leave Cairo and pursue contacts outside of Egypt. He travelled to Turkey with the dual aim of establishing an MI9 presence in the country, and developing routes for 'A' Force to pass deceptive information to the enemy. Whilst abroad 'A' Force nominally fell under the control of Victor Jones.

In Clarke's absence, what he later regarded as a power struggle emerged at Middle East Command. In October, a recently promoted and rising-star Colonel Ralph Bagnold was appointed "Chief Deception Officer" for the region. Bagnold and his staff took over tactical deception, leaving 'A' Force to handle strategic planning. Upon his return to Cairo, Clarke was annoyed both at the perceived power grab and the publicity around Bagnold's promotion (Clarke having previously invested effort in keeping deception low profile). Over the next few months, however, Bagnold's department began to take control of most of the theatre's deception planning, leaving 'A' Force responsible for training and advisory capacity (although Jones retained a lot of control over physical deception).

El Alamein and Cascade

Barclay

Legacy
'A' Force was an important step forward for Allied deception. Clarke's report in September 1941 was directly responsible for the creation of the London Controlling Section, Ops. (B) and the new focus on deceptive warfare through till the end of the war.

Structure and personnel
'A' Force was officially an organisation under Middle Eastern Command (Cairo).  As well as overseeing deception within the North African theatre it also represented MI9 (escape and evasion) in the region, as a cover role, which accounted for a good portion of its staff. The organisation expanded quickly from its founding, and by the end of the war had quite a large staff, some of the key individuals included;

References

Bibliography
 
 
 
 
 
 

North African campaign
Military deception during World War II